A beetle is an insect belonging to the order Coleoptera.

Beetle or The Beetle may also refer to:

Arts and entertainment
 Beetle (comics), the alias of a number of characters in Marvel Comics
 Beetle (game), a British party game
 Beetle (solitaire), a card game
 the title character of Beetle Bailey, an American newspaper comic strip
 The Beetle (film), a 1919 British silent film
 The Beetle (novel), an 1897 novel by Richard Marsh

People
 Alan Ackerman Beetle (1913–2003), U.S. botanist
 Walter Bedell Smith (1895–1961), U.S. Army general nicknamed "Beetle"

Places
 Beetle, Kentucky, United States
 Beetle Spur, Mount Patrick, Antarctica

Transportation
 Volkswagen Beetle (made 1938–2003), or two Volkswagen models with derivative styling:
 Volkswagen New Beetle (made 1997–2010)
 Volkswagen Beetle (A5) (made from 2011)
 Beetle (JR Kyushu), a Japanese ferry service
 Beetle Cat, a boat built by Beetle, Inc.

Other uses
 GE Beetle a mobile manipulator for nuclear material
 Beetle tank, or Goliath tracked mine, a German World War II unmanned fighting vehicle
 Alexandria Blue Anchors, or Alexandria Beetles, a former baseball team
 Beetle (ASIC), an application-specific integrated circuit
 Beetle, a large wooden mallet hammer

See also 
 American Beetles, a zoology book
 The American Beetles, a stage name used by The Ardells, a music band from Florida during the 1960s
 The Beatles (disambiguation)
 Betel, a leaf often chewed 
 Betel nut, or Areca nut